Skálafjørður, also known as Skálabotnur, is a village at the end of the Skálafjørður fjord on the Faroese island of Eysturoy located in Runavík Municipality. It changed its official name from Skálabotnur into Skálafjørður in 2019.

The 2015 population was 111. Its postal code is FO 485.

On 11 March 2019 a non-binding referendum on the official name of the village was held. 65% voted in favour of Skálafjørður while 35% chose Skálabotnur. The turnout was 74/83 (89%). Because the name Skálafjørður is usually inflected in the third case and preceded by the preposition í, thus as Í Skálafirði, confusion with the fjord-of-the-same-name may be limited.

See also
 List of towns in the Faroe Islands

References

External links
 Danish site with photographs of Skálabotnur/Skalafjørður

Populated places in the Faroe Islands